The  pan RNA motif defines a conserved RNA structure that was identified using bioinformatics.  pan motif RNAs are present in three phyla: Chloroflexota, Bacillota, and Pseudomonadota, although within the latter phylum they are only known in deltaproteobacteria.  A pan RNA is present in the Firmicute Bacillus subtilis, which is one of the most extensively studied bacteria.

pan RNAs appear to be located in the 5' untranslated regions of genes that encode enzymes involved in the synthesis of the vitamine pantothenate.  Thus it was proposed that the pan RNA motif represents a cis-regulatory element acting at the RNA level to regulate pantothenate synthesis.  The primary structural feature of pan RNAs is that they have one or two stem-loops that have two bulged adenosines.  Their relatively simple structure and lack of numerous conserved nucleotides is less typical of a riboswitch, and they were proposed to bind a protein.

References

External links
 

Cis-regulatory RNA elements